Raymond Kofi Rhule (born 6 November 1992) is a Ghanaian-born South African rugby union player for La Rochelle in the French Top 14.

Rugby playing career
Rhule played in the Springbok U20 side that won the 2012 Junior World Cup, scoring 3 tries.
His senior international rugby career started as a call-up for the Springbok squad for the 2012 end-of-year tour to England though he did not play before his first official test call up on 10 June 2017 against the French national team, which was played at Loftus Versfeld Pretoria. He scored his first test try on 19 August 2017 in Port Elizabeth in the Rugby Championship test match between South Africa and Argentina.

He played for the Cheetahs, scoring tries. However concerns were raised about his defence. He moved to the Stormers in 2018, but only played 15 times.

He then joined French Top 14 team  after the 2018 Super Rugby season, and then to La Rochelle, where his play fitted coach Ronan O'Gara's style of keeping the ball alive.

Honours

Club 
 La Rochelle
European Rugby Champions Cup: 2021–2022

References

External links

 

Living people
1992 births
South African rugby union players
Rugby union wings
Cheetahs (rugby union) players
Free State Cheetahs players
FC Grenoble players
Stade Rochelais players
Sportspeople from Accra
Ghanaian emigrants to South Africa
South Africa Under-20 international rugby union players
South Africa international rugby union players